Brian Burke (born April 19, 1958) is an American State Public Defender in Milwaukee, Wisconsin. Previously he was a state legislator.

Born in Milwaukee, Wisconsin, Burke graduated from Washington High School (Milwaukee, Wisconsin) in 1975 and Marquette University in 1978. He received his Juris Doctor degree in 1981 from Georgetown University Law Center.

In 1984, he was elected to the Milwaukee Common Council. From 1988 until 2003, Burke served in the Wisconsin State Senate.

Burke now works in the Milwaukee office of the Wisconsin State Public Defender as an assistant state public defender.

Notes

Marquette University alumni
Georgetown University Law Center alumni
Milwaukee Common Council members
Democratic Party Wisconsin state senators
1958 births
Living people
Public defenders